Katarina Grujić Gobeljić (born 20 May 1992) is a Serbian singer. She rose to prominence as a contestant on the singing competition show Zvezde Granda in 2012, finishing in eighth place. Subsequently, Grujić gained popularity with the singles "Jedno đubre obično" (2013) and "Lutka" (2014).

After graduating from a private high school, she attended the Faculty of Media and Communications at the Singidunum University. 

In August 2021, Grujić married Serbian footballer Marko Gobeljić. She gave birth to their daughter in December the same year.

Discography 
Studio albums
Jača doza mene (2018)

Filmography

References

External links
 
 

1992 births
Living people
Singers from Belgrade
21st-century Serbian women singers
 Serbian folk-pop singers
Serbian turbo-folk singers
Grand Production artists
Association footballers' wives and girlfriends